Sylvia Therese Richardson  is a French/British Bayesian statistician and is currently Professor of Biostatistics and Director of the MRC Biostatistics Unit at the University of Cambridge. In 2021 she became the president of the Royal Statistical Society for the 2021–22 year.

Education
Richardson completed her PhD at the University of Nottingham in 1978 with a thesis entitled "Ergodic properties of stopping time transformations”. She then went to study at Université Paris-Sud supervised by Jean Bretagnolle was awarded a Doctorat d'État for a thesis entitled "Processus spatialement dépendants: convergence vers la normalité, tests d'association et applications" in 1989.

Career
Richardson has been the MRC Research Professor of Biostatistics at the University of Cambridge, bye-fellow of Emmanuel College and Director of the Medical Research Council Biostatistics Unit since 2012. Previously, she was chair in Biostatistics at Imperial College London from 2000 and before that she was Directeur de Recherches at INSERM and held lectureships at Warwick University and the University of Paris V.

She is co-editor of the volume Markov Chain Monte Carlo in Practice with Wally Gilks and David Spiegelhalter.

Research
Richardson has made significant contributions to Bayesian statistical methodology and the application of Markov chain Monte Carlo. Her expertise is in spatial statistics with applications to geographic epidemiology and in biostatistics with applications in biochemical modeling, in particular modeling of gene expression data.

Recognition
Richardson was awarded the Guy Medal of The Royal Statistical Society in Silver in 2009.
She is also a Fellow of the Institute of Mathematical Statistics, of the International Society for Bayesian Analysis and of the Academy of Medical Sciences.

She was appointed Commander of the Order of the British Empire (CBE) in the 2019 Birthday Honours for services to medical statistics.

References

Year of birth missing (living people)
French statisticians
Bayesian statisticians
Women statisticians
Academics of Imperial College London
Living people
Fellows of the Institute of Mathematical Statistics
Fellows of the Academy of Medical Sciences (United Kingdom)
Commanders of the Order of the British Empire
French emigrants to England
Naturalised citizens of the United Kingdom
British statisticians